The United Nations resolutions concerning Syria have mainly dealt with the Arab–Israeli conflict, Syrian occupation of Lebanon and the Syrian Civil War.

Security Council Resolutions

General Assembly Resolutions

See also
 Vetoed UN resolutions on Syria
 Syrian conflict peace proposals
 List of Middle East peace proposals
 Authorization for the Use of Military Force Against the Government of Syria to Respond to Use of Chemical Weapons (S.J.Res 21) - September 2013 - Proposed United States resolution to authorize the President of the United States to intervene militarily in Syria in response to alleged chemical weapons attacks.

References

 
United Nations
Syria
Middle East peace efforts